Arne Kinserdal (born 17 February 1934) is a Norwegian economist and Professor Emeritus at the Norwegian School of Economics (NHH).

He served as rector of Norwegian School of Economics from 1985–1990.

References

1934 births
Living people
Norwegian School of Economics alumni
Academic staff of the Norwegian School of Economics
Rectors of the Norwegian School of Economics
20th-century Norwegian economists